Mycoporum is a genus of fungi belonging to the family Mycoporaceae.

The genus has cosmopolitan distribution.

Species

Species:

Mycoporum acervatum 
Mycoporum acharii 
Mycoporum antecellens

References

Pleosporales
Dothideomycetes genera